The 1975 Custom Credit Australian Indoor Championships was a men's professional tennis tournament played on indoor hard courts at the Hordern Pavilion in Sydney, Australia and was part of the 1975 Commercial Union Assurance Grand Prix as a Group AA category event. The tournament was held from 13 October through 19 October 1975. Unseeded Stan Smith won the singles title.

Finals

Singles

 Stan Smith defeated  Robert Lutz 7–6, 6–2
 It was Smith's 6th title of the year and the 55th of his career.

Doubles

 Brian Gottfried /  Raúl Ramírez defeated  Ross Case /  Geoff Masters 6–4, 6–2
 It was Gottfried's 13th title of the year and the 21st of his career. It was Ramírez's 15th title of the year and the 24th of his career.

References

External links
 ITF – tournament edition details

 
Australian Indoor Tennis Championships
Indoor
Australian Indoor Championships
Custom Credit Australian Indoor Championships